Moses ter Borch (1645–1667) was a Dutch Golden Age painter, whose work mostly consists of drawings.

Biography
Moses ter Borch was born in Zwolle as the youngest son of Gerard ter Borch the Elder and the brother of Gerard ter Borch and Gesina ter Borch, who taught him to draw and paint.
He died and was buried in Harwich as the result of wounds suffered during the Second Anglo-Dutch War.

Gallery

References

1645 births
1667 deaths
Dutch Golden Age painters
Dutch male painters
People from Zwolle
Sibling artists